Anders Donner (November 5, 1854 – April 15, 1938) was a professor of astronomy at the University of Helsinki observatory between 1883 and 1915. Before that, he served as a docent of astronomy between 1881–83. 
He was the rector of the university between 1911 and 1915 and acting chancellor 1917–1919 and 1921–1926.

Under the leadership of Donner, the observatory participated in the international star directory and star map project "Carte du Ciel". The star directory photograph work began in 1890 in Helsinki and it was ready in 1937. The Helsinki directory contains about 285,000 stars, their luminance and precise positions. Donner donated most of the work to the university.

The crater Donner on the far side of the Moon and the asteroid 1398 Donnera are named after him.

See also
Donner family

References

Finnish astronomers
1854 births
1938 deaths
Scientists from Helsinki
19th-century astronomers
Academic staff of the University of Helsinki
Corresponding members of the Saint Petersburg Academy of Sciences
Donner family
Rectors of the University of Helsinki
Chancellors of the University of Helsinki